T-word may refer to:

 The T-Word (film), a 2014 MTV documentary by Laverne Cox
 In Danish grammar, a linguistic term meaning "of neuter grammatical gender"
 T-word, a euphemism for tranny, a pejorative term for transgender individuals